State Trunk Highway 26 (often called Highway 26, STH-26, or WIS 26) is a state highway in the U.S. state of Wisconsin. The remaining sections of WIS 26 are a two-lane road. WIS 26 provides direct access from Janesville to Oshkosh via Fort Atkinson, Watertown, and Waupun.

Route description
WIS 26 begins in downtown Janesville, Rock County at U.S. Highway 51 (US 51, North Parker Drive), and follows East Centerway Street, to turn northeast on Milton Ave. WIS 26 crosses US 14 and Interstate 39/Interstate 90 (I-39/I-90) on the northeast side of the city. WIS 59 crosses WIS 26 in Milton. The highway turns northeast at the county line and approaches Fort Atkinson, but turns northwestward prior to entering the city, and bypasses it to the west with four exits to serve Fort Atkinson. Direct access is provided to WIS 106 and US 12. WIS 89 crosses the route, but no direct access is provided. It has three exits serving Jefferson including one at US 18. The highway passes through Johnson Creek at the interchange with I-94. The bypass has three exits serving Watertown including at WIS 19 and WIS 16.

After , WIS 26 crosses US 151 and passes through Waupun. WIS 26 joins US 151 and crosses into Fond du Lac County at its junction with WIS 49 in Waupun. WIS 26 joins US 151 for  then turns north off the US Highway. After , the highway crosses WIS 23 in Rosendale.

History
The original 1917 alignment of WIS 26 mostly followed the current alignment south of Juneau, but the segment north of Juneau was directed towards Theresa. In 1921, WIS 26 was extended via Kewaskum and Waldo to end at Sheboygan—via present-day WIS 28. In 1924, the route was realigned. From Juneau, it followed its present alignment to prsent-day US 41 and into Oshkosh, then continued north from that point along present day WIS 76 up to Greenville, turning westward onto present-day WIS 15 there to continue to New London. From there, the route followed present-day US 45, passing through Clintonville, Wittenberg, Antigo and Eagle River. The route connected with then M-26. WIS 26 was also concurrent with WIS 10 south of Janesville. In 1934, US 45 debuted, which replaced WIS 26 from Oshkosh northward. The route was truncated on the southern end to end at Janesville in the late 1940s.

Four bypasses were constructed for WIS 26—around Milton to the east in 2013-14, around Fort Atkinson to the west in the 1990s, around Jefferson to the west in the 2000s, and around Watertown to the west in 2012-14.

Major intersections

Special routes

Fort Atkinson business loop

Business WIS 26 in Fort Atkinson starts at WIS 26 Exit 17 and follows Janesville Ave., Robert St., Madison Ave., North 3rd St., and N. High St. before ending at WIS 26 Exit 23.

Jefferson business loop

Business WIS 26 in Jefferson starts at WIS 26 Exit 25 and follows the old routing of WIS 26 along Main St before ending at WIS 26 Exit 30.

Watertown business loop

Business WIS 26 in Watertown starts at WIS 26 Exit 39 and follows the old routing of WIS 26 along Church St. to Wisconsin 16. It then turns west with WIS 16 for a short distance before ending at WIS 26 Exit 45. Old WIS 26 north of WIS 16 is now County Hwy L.

Milton business loop

See also

References

External links

026
Transportation in Rock County, Wisconsin
Transportation in Jefferson County, Wisconsin
Transportation in Dodge County, Wisconsin
Transportation in Fond du Lac County, Wisconsin
Transportation in Winnebago County, Wisconsin
U.S. Route 45